Randall Duk Kim (born September 24, 1943) is an American stage, film, and television actor. He is a co-founder of the American Players Theatre.

Life 
Kim was born to a fundamentalist Baptist family of Chinese and Korean descent in Hawaii. He grew up on a farm near the Koko Head Crater. Kim was fascinated with stories while reading, listening to the radio or speaking with others. He developed an interest in acting as a child after seeing the musical Oklahoma! at the Honolulu Community Theatre. In high school, he would often watch plays at the University of Hawaii. After graduating high school, while visiting family in San Diego, he visited the Old Globe Theatre where he saw The Merchant of Venice, Twelfth Night, and Richard III. He credited Morris Carnovsky for inspiring him to become an actor. In 1964, Kim and his friend Charles Bright moved to New York City to pursue acting careers. His friend Bright became an apprentice with the Association of Producing on the Phoenix at 74th Street. Kim and Bright befriended the house manager and the house manager would give Kim unsold seats at shows. Kim spent time in London between 1966 and 1967 where he acquired a part time job and watched shows from the Royal Shakespeare Company.

He is married to actress and fellow American Players Theatre co-founder, Anne Occhiogrosso.

Career

Theater 
Kim began doing theater when he was 18 years old. He has portrayed a wide variety of roles on the stage, focusing upon Western classical works, including Shakespeare, Chekhov, Ibsen and Molière. He has spent most of his career in theater.

Kim starred in the first play written by an Asian American to be produced professionally in New York, The Chickencoop Chinaman by Frank Chin, which was mounted by The American Place Theatre in 1972.

Kim co-founded the American Players Theatre in Spring Green, Wisconsin with Anne Occhiogrosso and Charles Bright in 1977. He was the theater's artistic director.

In 1974, Kim starred in Chin's second play, The Year of the Dragon. Also that year, he became one of the first Asian-American actors to play a leading role in an American production of a Shakespeare play when he played the title role in The New York Public Theater's 1974 production of Pericles, Prince of Tyre.

Kim played the title role in Hamlet at the Guthrie Theatre in 1978–79.

He played Kralahome in the 1996 revival of The King and I on Broadway, later succeeding to the leading role. Other Broadway credits include Golden Child and the revised version of Flower Drum Song, both written by David Henry Hwang.

Film and television 
Kim portrayed the Keymaker in the film The Matrix Reloaded (2003).<ref>{{Cite web|last=Hiatt|first=Brian|date=May 22, 2003|title=The Matrix'''s Keymaker speaks out|url=https://ew.com/article/2003/05/22/matrixs-keymaker-speaks-out/|url-status=live|access-date=2021-04-27|website=EW.com|language=en}}</ref> He was originally asked by casting director Mali Finn for the role.

In 2008, he played mathematician Dashiell Kim in the episode "The Equation" of the television series Fringe.He played Grandpa Gohan in the live action Dragonball Evolution (2009).Kim voiced Po's and Shi-Fu’s teacher, Grand Master Oogway, in Kung Fu Panda (2008) and Kung Fu Panda 3'' (2016).

Filmography

Film

TV series

Video games

References

External links

1943 births
American male film actors
American male stage actors
American male television actors
American male video game actors
American male voice actors
Living people
American male actors of Korean descent
People from Spring Green, Wisconsin
20th-century American male actors
21st-century American male actors